The 2021–22 Bemidji State Beavers men's ice hockey season was the 66th season of play for the program. The team represented Bemidji State University in the 2021–22 NCAA Division I men's ice hockey season and for the first season in the Central Collegiate Hockey Association (CCHA). The Beavers were coached by Tom Serratore, in his 21st season, and played their home games at Sanford Center.

Season
Bemidji State joined with six other members of the WCHA to restart the CCHA for the 2021–22 season. The Beavers began the year with a difficult string of games, going 1–3 against non-conference teams that would both make the tournament. While the losses put them near the bottom of the standings, BSU was able to stay in the polls and keep their NCAA hopes alive with a sweep of Northern Michigan. The Beaves spent November hovering around 20th in the polls but a couple of losses knocked them out for good come December.

The chief problem for Bemidji State during the first half of their season was inconsistent goaltending. Tom Serratore had used all three of his netminders at times but none performed at a high level. Eventually the team went with freshman Mattias Sholl as the primary starter but the young goalie still was getting used to the college game.

After losing four consecutive game to ranked teams in December, Bemidji State had dropped down to .500 but, because of the poor record against good teams (2-8 against eventual tournament teams), the Beavers had very little to buoy themselves in the standings. Both the offense and defense played well for a three game stretch, however, that ended rather abruptly; BSU went 1-8 over a month-long stretch, only once score more than 2 goals (the solitary win) and surrendering 5 goals in five separate games. The losing streak made it impossible for the Beavers to make the tournament without a conference championship and put them in jeopardy of having to play on the road in the quarterfinals. The only thing that arrested their free-fall was a date with the worst team that season, St. Thomas, who was playing its first season at the Division I level.

The uninspired play to end their year did not bode well for Bemidji State in the conference tournament. Despite their play of late, the team recovered in the postseason and the defense led them to a pair of victories over Bowling Green. The conference semifinal could hardly have gone better for the Beavers as the offense finally reappeared during the third period, potting 3 goals in 5 minutes to lead them to a stunning upset of Michigan Tech.

Bemidji State was now just one win shy of making the tournament but standing in their way was the best team in the country, Minnesota State. Despite the pressure from the Mavericks, Sholl played probably his best game of the season and held MSU off of the scoresheet for the first half of the game. The Beavers took a lead half way through the second but lost it on a power play goal just before the end of the period. After neither team was able to score in the third, Bemidji State found themselves in the improbable position of needing just one goal to continue their year. Unfortunately, just three minutes into overtime, Minnesota State scored and ended the Beaver's run. 50 minutes later, after the Mavericks had been awarded the trophy and both teams had returned to their locker rooms, the game-winning goal was called off after additional replay angles revealed that the puck had not crossed the goal-line between the pipes but instead gone under the goal cage. Bemidji State's season was given new life and, after a warm-up period for both teams, the game was resumed. Unfortunately, like a boxer on their last legs, the Beaver's comeback only lasted until the next shot. Two minutes after resuming play, the Mavericks scored their second overtime goal, this time with no controversy, and the Beavers were knocked out.

Departures

Recruiting

Roster
As of September 13, 2021.

Standings

Schedule and results

|-
!colspan=12 style=";" | Exhibition

|-
!colspan=12 style=";" | Regular Season

|-
!colspan=12 style=";" | 

|- align="center" bgcolor="#e0e0e0"
|colspan=12|Bemidji State Won Series 2–1

Scoring statistics

Goaltending statistics

Rankings

Note: USCHO did not release a poll in week 24.

Awards and honors

References

2021-22
Bemidji State Beavers
Bemidji State Beavers
Bemidji State Beavers
Bemidji State Beavers